This is a list of electoral results for the electoral district of Maryborough in Victorian state elections.

Members for Maryborough

 Davies won both Maryborough and Villiers and Heytesbury at the August 1861 general elections, he resigned from Maryborough.

Election results

Elections in the 1920s

Elections in the 1910s

References

Victoria (Australia) state electoral results by district